William Tyrell Richardson (born September 3, 1999) is an American college basketball player for the Oregon Ducks of the Pac-12 Conference. He was named second-team All-Pac-12 as a senior in 2022.

High school career
Richardson first played high school basketball at Bradwell Institute in his hometown of Hinesville, Georgia. For his sophomore season, he transferred to Liberty County High School in Hinesville. Richardson was teammates with Davion Mitchell and Richard LeCounte, and helped his team win the Class 4A state championship. As a junior, he averaged 31.4 points, 8.6 rebounds, 5.3 assists and 2.6 steals per game, leading Liberty County to the state semifinals. Richardson posted a school-record 55 points and 14 rebounds against Bradwell Institute. He was named Region 2-3A Player of the Year. Richardson moved to Oak Hill Academy in Mouth of Wilson, Virginia for his senior season. He played in the Jordan Brand Classic. A four-star recruit ranked no. 38 in his class by ESPN, he committed to playing college basketball for Oregon over offers from Gonzaga and Georgia.

College career
As a freshman at Oregon, Richardson came off the bench and averaged six points, 2.5 assists and 2.4 rebounds per game. He averaged 11 points, 3.7 rebounds and 2.3 assists per game as a sophomore, leading the Pac-12 Conference in three-point field goal percentage (46.9). Richardson underwent left thumb surgery before his junior season and missed his first 12 games of the season. On March 7, 2021, he scored a career-high 22 points in an 80–67 win over Oregon State. As a junior, Richardson averaged 11.3 points, 3.9 assists and 3.4 rebounds per game. He was named second-team All-Pac-12 as a senior.

Career statistics

College

|-
| style="text-align:left;"| 2018–19
| style="text-align:left;"| Oregon
| 38 || 12 || 24.3 || .468 || .278 || .675 || 2.4 || 2.5 || 1.1 || .2 || 6.0
|-
| style="text-align:left;"| 2019–20
| style="text-align:left;"| Oregon
| 31 || 13 || 30.3 || .479 || .469 || .848 || 3.7 || 2.3 || 1.4 || .2 || 11.0
|-
| style="text-align:left;"| 2020–21
| style="text-align:left;"| Oregon
| 16 || 16 || 35.5 || .443 || .403 || .738 || 3.4 || 3.9 || 1.1 || .1 || 11.3
|-
| style="text-align:left;"| 2021–22
| style="text-align:left;"| Oregon
| 30 || 30 || 32.3 || .454 || .388 || .772 || 3.7 || 3.6 || 1.3 || .0 || 14.1
|- class="sortbottom"
| style="text-align:center;" colspan="2"| Career
| 115 || 71 || 29.6 || .462 || .392 || .757 || 3.2 || 2.9 || 1.2 || .1 || 10.2

References

External links
Oregon Ducks bio

1999 births
Living people
American men's basketball players
Basketball players from Georgia (U.S. state)
People from Hinesville, Georgia
Oregon Ducks men's basketball players
Oak Hill Academy (Mouth of Wilson, Virginia) alumni
Point guards
Shooting guards